Dnevni avaz (English: Daily Voice) is the most influential and best-selling daily newspaper in Bosnia and Herzegovina. It is published in Sarajevo. Their web portal Avaz.ba is the third most visited website in Bosnia and Herzegovina, after Google and YouTube.

Background
Dnevni avaz evolved from a weekly publication Bošnjački avaz which was first published in September 1993. In 1994 it became known simply as Avaz and was published weekly in Bosnia and Herzegovina and Germany. In 1995 it was reestablished by Fahrudin Radončić as a daily newspaper.

Dnevni avaz is part of the "avaz-roto press" publishing house, the biggest media house in Bosnia and Herzegovina. The paper is based in Sarajevo and has a relative pro-Bosniak and pro-Bosnian stances (centre-right).

, the Avaz publishing house was expanded with the start of the construction of the Avaz Twist Tower, a 175 m skyscraper in Sarajevo’s Marijin Dvor neighborhood, in the Centar Municipality of Sarajevo. Avaz Twist Tower is currently the highest skyscraper in the Balkans region. 

The company's former headquarters, the Avaz Business Centre (Former Oslobođenje Building), has been converted into a hotel, Radon Plaza Hotel (based on the owner's last name Radončić).

Supplements
Dnevni avaz has published The New York Times International Weekly on Thursdays since 2009. This 8-page supplement features a selection of English language articles from The New York Times.

Avaz assets

Avaz Twist Tower
Hotel Radon Plaza (formerly: Avaz Business Center)

References

External links
 

1995 establishments in Bosnia and Herzegovina
Newspapers established in 1993
Newspapers published in Sarajevo
Mass media in Sarajevo
Grad Sarajevo
Bosnia and Herzegovina news websites